The Forthing Lingzhi is a range of MPVs produced by Dongfeng Liuzhou Motor under the Forthing (Dongfeng Fengxing) sub-brand. It is the first product of the Forthing brand by Dongfeng Liuzhou Motor.

Overview
At launch, the Forthing Lingzhi was essentially a rebadged fourth generation Mitsubishi Delica or the Mitsubishi Delica Space Gear. The Delica platform was acquired from Taiwan’s China Motor Corporation, a partner of Mitsubishi Motors. Therefore, the initial facelifts from Dongfeng Liuzhou were identical to the Taiwanese China Motor Corporation built Mitsubishi Space Gear. After the China Motor Corporation built Mitsubishi Space Gears were discontinued in Taiwan, Dongfeng Liuzhou continued the production in China and conducted their own facelifts and development of the model.

Three trim levels were developed after the facelift by Dongfeng Liuzhou was conducted, including the Lingzhi M5, M3, and V3, which targets different groups of consumers and were priced differently. The M5 is the premium version, featuring a restyled front DRG and restyled tail lamps with prices ranging from 77,900 yuan to 98,900 yuan. The M3 being the basic passenger version sharing the same front DRG design and same tail lamps with the V3 but with clear DLO with prices ranging from 55,900 yuan to 71,900 yuan. The V3 is the utility cargo version with a sealed cargo area and being the most affordable of the three trim levels with prices ranging from 55,900 yuan to 66,900 yuan. Each trim is available with a long wheelbase version called the Lingzhi M5L, M3L, and V3L respectively all sharing the same tail lamp design.

A facelift was launched in 2020 featuring redesigned front bumper and grilles. The engine of the post-facelift model is a 1.6 liter naturally aspirated engine with a 5-speed manual transmission MT and a newly added 2.0 liter engine producing 122hp and 200Nm mated to a 6-speed manual transmission.

References

External links 

Fengxing Lingzhi
Minivans
Vans
Minibuses
Rear-wheel-drive vehicles
Cars introduced in 2001
2010s cars
Cars of China